Inga Kesper (born 22 September 1968) is a German former biathlete. She competed in two events at the 1992 Winter Olympics.

References

External links
 

1968 births
Living people
Biathletes at the 1992 Winter Olympics
German female biathletes
Olympic biathletes of Germany
People from Waldeck-Frankenberg
Sportspeople from Kassel (region)
20th-century German women